Koray Kılınç (born 4 March 2000) is a Turkish footballer who plays as a forward for Bodrumspor.

Club career
On 1 September 2019, Kılınç made his Süper Lig debut on away encounter at week 3 against Fenerbahçe S.K., ended 1–1.

International career
On 5 and 6 December 2018, Kılınç earned two caps with the Turkey national futsal team at U-19 level, both against Serbia, both ended respective wins for Turkey as 0–3 and 2–4.

Honours
Trabzonspor
Turkish Cup: 2019–20

References

External links
 Profile at TFF
 

2000 births
Sportspeople from Trabzon
Living people
Association football forwards
Turkish footballers
Turkey youth international footballers
Trabzonspor footballers
Turgutluspor footballers
İstanbulspor footballers
Sarıyer S.K. footballers
Süper Lig players
TFF First League players
TFF Second League players